China Metal Recycling (Holdings) Limited was a company the largest recycler of scrap metal in Mainland China by revenue. Based in Guangzhou, Guangdong, it was mainly engaged in collecting scrap steel, scrap copper and other scrap metals and processing them using equipment to produce recycled scrap metals for its customers. Its recycling facilities were located in Guangdong, Jiangsu and Hong Kong. The company was wound up and de-listed after accounting fraud surfaced.

History
The company was established in 2000. The company was listed on the Hong Kong Stock Exchange in June 2009 with the IPO price of HK$5.15 per share. Its stock price was closed at HK$6.44 at the first trading day, 24% higher than its IPO price. On 17 November 2009, its price suddenly plunged 24%, the most since listing, as its chief financial officer, Wong Hok-leung, resigned after saying he was denied information.  
Trading in the shares of the company on the Stock Exchange was halted from 9:17 a.m. on 28 January 2013. American short-seller Glaucus Research Group said that "CMR purports to be the largest scrap metal recycling company in China. We believe this is a lie. Publicly accessible import data from the Chinese government suggests CMR is a blatant fraud that has deceived the market about the size of its business." Chun Chi Wai, the chairman and chief executive officer of the company, announced that he had engaged legal advisers to initiate legal proceedings against Glaucus.

The Securities and Futures Commission won a court order in February 2015 to wind up the company, and the company was delisted from SEHK in December 2015 for "obtaining its initial listing by fraud."

See also
China Medical Technologies
 List of companies of China

References

External links
China Metal Recycling (Holdings) Limited

Chinese companies established in 2000
Companies based in Guangzhou
Companies listed on the Hong Kong Stock Exchange
Metal companies of China
Privately held companies of China
Recycling in China
Waste companies established in 2000
Waste management companies of China
2000 establishments in China